Malaysia participated in the 2007 Asian Winter Games held in Changchun, China from 28 January 2007 to 4 February 2007.

Ice hockey

Men's tournament
Group D

Fifth to eighth place classification

Seventh and eighth place classification

Ranked 8th in final standings

References

Nations at the 2007 Asian Winter Games
Asian Winter Games
Malaysia at the Asian Winter Games